Megachile sejuncta is a species of bee in the family Megachilidae. It was described by Theodore Dru Alison Cockerell in 1927.

References

Sejuncta
Insects described in 1927